Wormwood may refer to:

Biology
 Several plants of the genus Artemisia:
 Artemisia abrotanum, southern wormwood
 Artemisia absinthium, common wormwood, grande wormwood or absinthe wormwood
 Artemisia annua, sweet wormwood or annual wormwood
 Artemisia herba-alba, white wormwood, the wormwood of the Bible
 Artemisia pontica, Roman wormwood
 Artemisia verlotiorum
 Artemisia vulgaris
 A caterpillar that eats some of the above:
 Cucullia absinthii, a caterpillar/moth in the family Noctuidae

Places
 Wormwood Scrubs, an open space in the Hammersmith area of West London
 HM Prison Wormwood Scrubs, a prison in West London
 Wormwood Street, in the City of London
 Wormwood Forest, former name of the Red Forest in Ukraine, surrounding the Chernobyl Nuclear Power Plant within the Exclusion Zone

Arts and entertainment

Fictional entities
 Wormwood, a character in C. S. Lewis's The Screwtape Letters
 Matilda Wormwood, the title character of the children's novel Matilda by Roald Dahl
 Miss Wormwood, a minor character in Calvin and Hobbes
 Mrs Wormwood, a character in the first episode of The Sarah Jane Adventures, Invasion of the Bane, who reappeared in Enemy of the Bane

Film and television
 Wormwood (TV series), a 2007 Canadian and Australian children's television program
 Wormwood (miniseries), a 2017 docudrama directed by Errol Morris

Literature
 Wormwood (Bible), a 'star' that falls to earth in the end times, makes water bitter, and kills many people
 Wormwood (short story collection), a book of short horror stories by Poppy Z. Brite
 Wormwood (Taylor novel), a 2004 fantasy novel by Graham Taylor
 Wormwood, a collection of science fiction stories by Terry Dowling
 Wormwood: A Drama of Paris, an 1890 novel by Marie Corelli

Periodicals
 Wormwood (magazine), a magazine of literature and literary criticism
 Wormwood: Gentleman Corpse, a comic book series by Ben Templesmith
 Wormwood Review, a literary magazine published from 1959 to 1999
 Chronicles of Wormwood, a comic book miniseries by Garth Ennis from Avatar Press

Music
 Wormwood, a side-project band featuring two members of Doomriders
 Wormwood (Marduk album), 2009
 Wormwood (Moe album), 2003
 Wormwood (The Acacia Strain album), 2010
 Wormwood: Curious Stories from the Bible, a 1998 album by the Residents
 Wormwood Live, a 1999 live album by the Residents

See also
 Wyrmwood, a 2014 horror film by Kiah Roache-Turner